Borivoje "Bora" Todorović (5 November 1929 – 7 July 2014) was a Serbian actor. He was the younger brother of the actress, Mira Stupica, and father of Srđan Todorović.

Biography
He had an extensive acting career, and has had roles in critically acclaimed Yugoslavian films such as The Marathon Family (1982), Balkan Express (1983), Balkanski Špijun (Balkan Spy, 1984), Time of the Gypsies (1988), and Underground (1995).

His father died when he was a child. Following secondary school, Bora completed army service, at which point he had no plans to pursue an acting career. However, his older sister Mira's passion for acting exposed him to the business and soon he became passionate about it as well. He enrolled in the Belgrade Drama Arts Academy, and eventually acted on stage at the Beogradsko Dramsko Pozorište (Belgrade Drama Theatre). In 1957, Bora lived and acted in Zagreb, eventually returning to Belgrade in 1961. Between 1961 and 1983, Bora was a member of the "Atelje 212" theater in Belgrade, where he performed various roles. In October 2002, he appeared on the Zvezdara Teatar in Belgrade in the play Larry Thompson.

In his last years, Bora Todorović alternated between residences in Prague and Belgrade. He was married to American former gymnast and translator, Carolyn Kilkka–Todorović, with whom he had two children, a writer Dana (born 2 October 1977) and Tara (born 23 June 1993), who is a volleyball player. His son Srđan Todorović (b. 1965), who also became an actor, is from his previous marriage to Snežana Matić.

Awards

In November 2002, he received the Lifetime Achievement Award "Pavle Vujisić" for his roles in Yugoslav cinema, and in December 2006, he received the Lifetime Achievement Award "Dobričin prsten" for his roles in Yugoslav theater.

See also
List of Yugoslavian films
List of Serbian films

References

External links

 
 2004 Interview

Serbian male film actors
Serbian male stage actors
Yugoslav male film actors
1929 births
2014 deaths
Male actors from Belgrade
20th-century Serbian male actors
Yugoslav male stage actors
Laureates of the Ring of Dobrica